Chamjilli station is a railway station in Chamjil-li, Kangsŏ-guyŏk, Namp'o Special City, North Korea. It is the terminus of a branchline from Kangsŏn on the P'yŏngnam Line of the Korean State Railway.

At Chamjilli there are spurs serving a number of industries above ground, as well as a spur leading underground into the Namp'o Kangsŏ Missile Factory's underground facility.

References

Railway stations in North Korea